The National Institute of Corrections (NIC) is an agency of the United States government. It is part of the Federal Bureau of Prisons.

History 
The NIC was created by the United States Congress in 1974, based on the recommendation of the National Conference on Corrections convened by Attorney General John N. Mitchell in 1971. Mitchell called for the conference as a result of public pressure following Attica Prison riot in September 1971.

Scope 
The NIC provides training, technical assistance, information services, and policy/program development assistance to federal, state, and local corrections agencies. Additionally, the NIC provides funds to support programs that are in line with its key initiatives.

See also
 Incarceration in the United States

References

External links 
 
 National Institute of Corrections in the Federal Register

Federal Bureau of Prisons
Penal system in the United States
United States Department of Justice agencies
1974 establishments in the United States
Government agencies established in 1974